The 2017–18 Slovenian PrvaLiga (also known as the  Prva liga Telekom Slovenije for sponsorship reasons) was the 27th edition of the Slovenian PrvaLiga since its establishment in 1991. The season began on 15 July 2017 and ended on 27 May 2018.

Competition format
Each team played 36 matches (18 home and 18 away). Teams played four matches against each other (2 home and 2 away).

Teams
A total of ten teams contested the league, including eight from the 2016–17 Slovenian PrvaLiga and two promoted from the 2016–17 Slovenian Second League.

Stadiums and locations
Seating capacity only; some stadiums also have standing areas. Ankaran played their home matches in Dravograd and Nova Gorica since their stadium, ŠRC Katarina, did not met PrvaLiga criteria.

Personnel and kits

Managerial changes

League table

Standings

Results

First half of the season

Second half of the season

PrvaLiga play-off
A two-legged play-off between Triglav Kranj, the ninth-placed team in the PrvaLiga and Drava Ptuj, the second-placed team in the 2. SNL, was played in June 2018. The winner, Triglav Kranj, secured a place in the 2018–19 PrvaLiga season.

Triglav Kranj won 6–3 on aggregate.

Awards

Annual awards
PrvaLiga Player of the Season
Senijad Ibričić

PrvaLiga U23 Player of the Season
Luka Zahović

PrvaLiga Team of the Season

See also
2017–18 Slovenian Football Cup
2017–18 Slovenian Second League

References

External links
 

Slovenian PrvaLiga seasons
Slovenia
1